Raosaheb Dadarao Danve (born 18 March 1955) is an Indian politician and current Minister of State in the Ministry of Railways, Ministry of Coal and Ministry of Mines in Second Modi ministry. He is a member of Bharatiya Janata Party and got elected to Lok Sabha from Jalna for 5th straight time in 2019 general elections. He previously served as Minister of State for Consumer Affairs, Food and Public Distribution from 30 May 2019 to July 7, 2021 and also as Maharashtra state President of BJP

Personal life 
Danve was born to Kesharabai and Dadarao on 18 March 1956. Danve married Nirmala Tai in 1977. They have 3 daughters & Son Santosh Danve, who is a Bhartiya Janata Party MLA from Bhokardan Legislative Constituency.

Political career
Danve has held leadership positions at all levels of politics in India beginning since 1976. He is known as a leader with rural roots. Danve began his political career as a Sarpanch in 1978, becoming an MLA in 1990 & in 1995 from Bhokardan assembly constituency, and 5 time consecutive Member of parliament since 1999, 2004, 2009, 2014, & May 2019.

During the general elections that were held in May 2014, Danve won the Jalna constituency for the fourth time. Immediately afterwards, he was sworn in by the Prime Minister Narendra Modi as the Minister of State for Ministry of Consumer Affairs, Food and Public Distribution, the position he held till March 2015.

Meanwhile, Maharashtra assembly elections were held in October 2014. BJP came to power and Devendra Fadnavis became first BJP Chief Minister of Maharashtra. However, as per the BJP culture, one person only holds one post a time, and hence Devendra Fadnavis resigned as the President of Maharashtra BJP and the search for a new leader commenced. Raosaheb Danve indicated to the party leadership that he was willing to resign as a minister and in January 2015 he was appointed as the President of Maharashtra BJP by Amit Shah, the national President of BJP. Raosaheb Danve is only the second person in Maharashtra BJP to hold this office while also being a Member of Parliament. Earlier, late Suryabhan Vahadane-Patil had successfully carried the dual responsibility.

Danve has attracted controversy due to his freewheeling public comments that may be misconstrued objectionably. For example, in 2016, a FIR was lodged against him for asking voters to accept Laxmi coming to their homes on election eve (alluding to vote buying). When the prices of Tur fell in May 2017, Danve used the term "saale" to chide the "oversensitive farmers". Use of such term was criticised by the opposition parties and Danve expressed his regrets concerning his comment. Later, in 2019, he said that the word saale is a common slang term which is not derogatory in rural marathwada, and he never intended to offend farmers.

In May 2019, Danve became Minister of State for Consumer Affairs, Food and Public Distribution.

Within BJP 
President, BJP Maharashtra (2014)
President, Bharatiya Janata Party BJP, Dist. Jalna, Maharashtra
Vice-President, BJP Maharashtra

Legislative 

1990-95: Member, Maharashtra Legislative Assembly (First Terms)
1995-99: Member, Maharashtra Legislative Assembly (Two Terms)
1990-99: Chairman, Panchayati Raj Committee
1990-99: Chairman, Assurances Committee
1999-2000:	Member, Committee on Commerce
2000-2004:	Member, Consultative Committee, Ministry of Rural Development
2000-2004:	Member, Committee on Finance
2000-2004: Member, Consultative Committee, Ministry of Communications and Information Technology
5 Aug. 2007: Member, Committee on Agriculture
31 Aug. 2009: Member, Committee on Petroleum and Natural Gas
31 Aug. 2009: Member, Committee on Commerce
15 July 2015 onwards: Member, Standing Committee on Information Technology
27 May 2014 to 5 March 2015: Union Minister of State, Ministry of Consumer Affairs, Food and Public Distribution
30 May 2019 to present: Union Minister of State, Ministry of Consumer Affairs, Food and Public Distribution

References

External links

 Official biographical sketch in Parliament of India website

Living people
1956 births
India MPs 1999–2004
India MPs 2004–2009
India MPs 2009–2014
India MPs 2014–2019
India MPs 2019–present
Maharashtra MLAs 1990–1995
Maharashtra MLAs 1995–1999
Bharatiya Janata Party politicians from Maharashtra
Lok Sabha members from Maharashtra
People from Jalna, Maharashtra
People from Marathwada